Events from the year 1943 in Scotland.

Incumbents 

 Secretary of State for Scotland and Keeper of the Great Seal – Tom Johnston

Law officers 
 Lord Advocate – James Reid
 Solicitor General for Scotland – Sir David King Murray

Judiciary 
 Lord President of the Court of Session and Lord Justice General – Lord Normand
 Lord Justice Clerk – Lord Cooper
 Chairman of the Scottish Land Court – Lord Gibson

Events 
 11 February – At the Midlothian and Peebles Northern by-election, the radical socialist Common Wealth Party candidate Tom Wintringham comes close to winning the seat (which is held for the Unionist Party by Sir David King Murray).
 24 February – Royal Navy submarine  is lost with all 37 crew on sea trials in the Sound of Bute; she would not be located until 1994.
 27 March – Royal Navy escort carrier  is destroyed by an accidental explosion in the Firth of Clyde, killing 379 of the crew of 528.
 21 April – "Big Blitz" bombing of Aberdeen.
 30 May – Royal Navy submarine  is lost with all hands on a training exercise in the Firth of Clyde.
 19 June – Jackie Paterson wins the world flyweight boxing title by a knockout in the first minute at Hampden Park in Glasgow.
 5 August – North of Scotland Hydro-Electric Board established by Act of Parliament (with headquarters in Edinburgh).
 11 November – Total evacuation of an area near Portmahomack in Easter Ross begins, to make way for rehearsal of the Normandy Landings.
 2 December – Broughty Ferry pigeon Winkie, serving with the Royal Air Force, is among the first recipients of the Dickin Medal, instituted to honour the work of animals in war.
 The last crofting family leaves the island of South Rona.
 Ferranti open a plant at Crewe Toll in Edinburgh, originally to manufacture gyro gunsights for aircraft.

Births 
 23 January – Ernie Hannigan, footballer (died 2015 in Australia)
 31 January – Peter McRobbie, screen actor in the United States
 18 February – Graeme Garden, author, actor, comedian, artist and television presenter, one of The Goodies
 1 March – Witold Rybczynski, Canadian American architect, born in Edinburgh
 3 April – John Hughes, footballer (died 2022))
 16 April – Morris Stevenson, footballer (died 2014)
 19 April – Margo MacDonald, politician (died 2014)
 1 May – Ian Dunn, gay and paedophile rights activist, founder of the Scottish Minorities Group (died 1998)
 5 May – Kay Ullrich, politician (died 2021)
 10 May – Jack Bruce, rock musician (died 2014)
 22 June – J. Michael Kosterlitz, Scottish-born condensed matter physicist, recipient of the Nobel Prize in Physics
 16 July – Ian Donald Cochrane Hopkins, comedy writer
 18 July – Robin MacDonald, pop guitarist (died 2015)
 20 August – Sylvester McCoy, born Percy James Patrick Kent-Smith, actor
 16 October – Tommy Gemmell, footballer (died 2017)
 24 November – Robin Williamson, acoustic musician
 28 November – George T. Miller, film director (died 2023 in Australia)
 Alan Bold, poet and biographer (died 1998)
 G. C. Peden, historian
 D. R. Thorpe, biographer

Deaths 
 17 June – Annie S. Swan, novelist (born 1859)
 8 September - Anderson Gray McKendrick, military physician and epidemiologist, (born 1876)
 15 October – William Soutar, poet (born 1898)
 23 December – George Henry, painter (born 1858)
 Ann Scott-Moncrieff, author (born 1914)

The arts
 November – Sorley MacLean's first collection of Gaelic poems, Dàin do Eimhir agus Dàin Eile, is published.
 Glasgow Citizens Theatre founded.
 Poetry Scotland magazine founded in Glasgow by Maurice Lindsay.

See also 
 Timeline of Scottish history
 1943 in Northern Ireland

References 

 
Years of the 20th century in Scotland
Scotland
1940s in Scotland